Saint-Louis-du-Ha! Ha! is a parish municipality in the Témiscouata Regional County Municipality of the Bas-Saint-Laurent region of Quebec. The population is 1,318.  Its economy is mainly agricultural. It is located southeast of Rivière-du-Loup and west of Cabano along the Trans-Canada Highway (Route 185), about halfway to Edmundston in New Brunswick.

History
The parish began in 1860 as the site of a Roman Catholic mission; it was named in 1874.

In September 2017, the municipality established a Guinness World Record for the "Most exclamation marks in a town name".

Etymology

The Commission de toponymie du Québec asserts that the parish's name refers to nearby Lake Témiscouata, the sense of haha here being an archaic French word for an impasse; see Ha-ha. The Louis may refer to Louis Marquis, one of the first colonists of the region, or Louis-Antoine Proulx, vicar of Rivière-du-Loup, or perhaps the abbot Louis-Nicolas Bernier.  Saint-Louis-du-Ha! Ha! is the only town in the world with two exclamation points in its name, and shares the distinction of having an exclamation point in its name with Westward Ho!, a village in Devon, in south-west England.

Demographics 
In the 2021 Census of Population conducted by Statistics Canada, Saint-Louis-du-Ha!

See also 
 Baie des Ha! Ha!: A bay on the Saint Lawrence River in the Côte-Nord region.
 Baie des Ha! Ha!: A bay on the Saguenay River in the Saguenay–Lac-Saint-Jean region.
 Est! Est!! Est!!! di Montefiascone
 Hamilton!, Ohio, United States, city that briefly added an exclamation point to its name
 List of parish municipalities in Quebec
 Rivière Ha! Ha!: A river in Saguenay–Lac-Saint-Jean.
 Truth or Consequences, New Mexico, United States; a town that renamed itself after a radio show
 Westward Ho!, a village in Devon, England

References

External links

 
  
 :fr:Ha! Ha! , a disambiguation page in the French Wikipedia for "Ha! Ha!" place names in Quebec

Parish municipalities in Quebec
Incorporated places in Bas-Saint-Laurent
Populated places established in 1860